Phillip John Verchota (born December 28, 1956) is an American former professional ice hockey forward. He is best known for being a member of the Miracle on Ice 1980 U.S. Olympic hockey team that won the gold medal. He was the captain of the U.S. hockey team at the 1984 Winter Olympics.

Amateur career
Verchota attended Duluth East High School where he also was a star defensive tackle in gridiron football and recruited for both football and hockey at the University of Minnesota. However, he chose not to play on the football team and devoted all attention on playing hockey for the Minnesota Gophers. Verchota was a member of the 1976 and 1979 NCAA championship teams coached by Herb Brooks.

International/professional career
Verchota made his international debut at the 1979 Ice Hockey World Championship in Moscow after his college career had ended. He then joined the U.S. Olympic team on a full-time basis for the 1979-80 season.

After the Olympics, Verchota opted to play overseas with Jokerit in Finland rather than sign a contract with the Minnesota North Stars, who had drafted him 75th overall in the 1976 NHL Entry Draft (he also turned down an offer from the North Stars in 1977 to leave U. of Minnesota early). Verchota also played for the U.S. national team at the 1981 ice hockey world championship tournament in Stockholm before taking a one-year sabbatical from hockey. 
He rejoined the U.S. national team as a full-time player in 1982/83 and helped the United States win the ice hockey world championship "Pool B" qualifying tournament in the spring of 1983. He continued with the US national program until the 1984 Winter Olympics in Sarajevo, and retired from hockey afterwards.

Post playing career
Verchota (who is a business administration major and Williams Scholar at University of Minnesota) went into banking after retirement and became senior vice president of First American Bank in Willmar, Minnesota. He was named one of the 50 greatest players in University of Minnesota hockey history as part of "Legends on Ice" tribute in 2001. His skates from 1980 are part of the National Museum of American History collection.

In popular culture
Verchota is not featured in a 1981 TV movie about the 1980 U.S. hockey team called Miracle on Ice, but does appear in archival footage of the medal ceremony where he is awarded the gold medal.

In the 2004 Disney film Miracle, he is played by Kris Wilson, who in 2002 led the University of Wisconsin-Superior to the NCAA Division III hockey championship.

Career statistics

Regular season and playoffs

International

References

External links
 
 Phil Verchota's Hockeydraftcentral.com bio

1956 births
1980 US Olympic ice hockey team
American men's ice hockey left wingers
Calgary Cowboys draft picks
Ice hockey people from Duluth, Minnesota
Ice hockey players at the 1980 Winter Olympics
Ice hockey players at the 1984 Winter Olympics
Jokerit players
Living people
Medalists at the 1980 Winter Olympics
Minnesota Golden Gophers men's ice hockey players
Minnesota North Stars draft picks
Olympic gold medalists for the United States in ice hockey
NCAA men's ice hockey national champions